is a Fukui Railway Fukubu Line railway station located in the city of Echizen, Fukui Prefecture, Japan.

Lines

Station layout
The station consists of two ground-level side platforms connected to the wooden station building by a level crossing. The station is unattended, but there is a public telephone and vending machine available.

Adjacent stations

History

Surrounding area
Fukui Railway company headquarters
Fukui Railway train maintenance facility and bus depot
Takefu High School

See also
 List of railway stations in Japan

References

External links

  

Railway stations in Fukui Prefecture
Railway stations in Japan opened in 1924
Fukui Railway Fukubu Line
Echizen, Fukui